Daza is a genus of cicadas in the family Cicadidae. There are at least two described species in Daza.

Species
These two species belong to the genus Daza:
 Daza montezuma (Walker, 1850) i c g
 Daza nayaritensis Davis, 1934 i c g
Data sources: i = ITIS, c = Catalogue of Life, g = GBIF, b = Bugguide.net

References

Further reading

 
 
 
 
 
 

Zammarini
Cicadidae genera